Psathyrella longipes, the tall Psathyrella, is a species of agaric fungus in the family Psathyrellaceae and the brittlestem genus, Psathyrella. It was originally described as Hypholoma longipes by Charles Horton Peck in 1895; Alexander H. Smith transferred it to Psathyrella in 1941.

As its name implies, the tall Psathyrella is unusual in its genus in having a relatively long stipe, 5-12cm long and 2-6mm thick.  Its cap is 2.5-4.5cm in diameter and conical, and has a "veil" of creamy-white fragments which contrast with its basic dull brown colour.  The tall Psathyrella has an almost world-wide distribution: reports to iNaturalist show it as present in almost every country in Europe and North Africa, in most states and provinces of North America, in several South American countries, in East Asia and in Australia.  It fruits in autumn and early winter.

See also
List of Psathyrella species

References

External links

Fungi described in 1895
Fungi of North America
Psathyrellaceae
Taxa named by Charles Horton Peck